Archibald McKay "Archie" Fraser (February 9, 1914 – August 2, 1993) was a Canadian professional ice hockey player who played three games in the National Hockey League with the New York Rangers. Born in Souris, Manitoba, Fraser is the brother of Harvey Fraser.

References

External links

1914 births
1993 deaths
Canadian ice hockey centres
Ice hockey people from Manitoba
New York Rangers players
People from Souris, Manitoba
Wembley Monarchs players